Taiping Tianguo or Tai Ping Tian Guo may refer to:

 Taiping Rebellion, a civil war in China during the Qing Dynasty from 1850 to 1864.
 Taiping Heavenly Kingdom, an oppositional state established in China by Hong Xiuquan, leader of the Taiping Rebellion.
 Twilight of a Nation, a 1988 Hong Kong TV series.
 The Taiping Heavenly Kingdom, a 2000 Chinese TV series.
 Buddha Bless America, a 1996 Taiwanese film by Wu Nien-jen.